Adventist College of Education is a teacher education college in Asokore (New Juaben Municipal District, Eastern Region Ghana). The college is located in Eastern / Greater Accra zone. It is one of the about 40 public colleges of education in Ghana. The college participated in the DFID-funded T-TEL programme.

The college is affiliated to the University of Education, Winneba.

History 
The S.D.A College of Education was established by the government in collaboration with the SDA Church on 26 October 1962 with 120 students. The College is about 84 kilometres from Accra, Ghana’s capital. It has an area of 35.9 hectares (about 88.75 acres).

The highest governing body of the College is the Board of Governors which is chaired by Pastor Kwabena Twum, President of East Ghana Conference of S.D.A Church.

Education 
The SDA college of education offers Bachelor in Basic Education.

Programmes 

 Early Grade Education 
Primary Education 
J.H.S Education

Notable alumni 
Pastor Dr. Seth A. Laryea, the President of Valley View University at Oyibi, Accra.

Pastor Dr. A. L. Ewoo

Dr. D. R. Asafo, Mr. Joshua

Dr. Yaw Afari Ankoma

Dr. Frederick Ocansey

Prof. Kwame Ameyaw Domfe.

References

External links 

 National Accreditation Board Website

Christian universities and colleges in Ghana
Colleges of Education in Ghana
Universities and colleges affiliated with the Seventh-day Adventist Church
Educational institutions established in 1962
1962 establishments in Ghana
Education in the Eastern Region (Ghana)